Marco Adaggio (born 6 October 1987) is an Anglo-Italian association footballer who last played as a striker for Chasetown.

Career
Born to Italian and English parents in Málaga, Spain, Adaggio moved to Shropshire, England aged 11, having spent his earlier childhood in Naples and Rimini, Italy. He joined the Centre of Excellence of local club Shrewsbury Town.

Adaggio made his club début on 2 April 2005 in the 3–0 home win over Oxford United. On 18 April 2006 he made his tenth appearance for "the Shrews", all of which came as a substitute. Earlier in the season he had spent time on loan to local rivals AFC Telford United. At the end of the season, two years into his three-year scholarship programme, he was handed a professional contract.

Despite a few first team appearances for the club, Adaggio was unable to command a regular first-team place, and in January 2007 he was released by the club, along with fellow squad player Gavin Cadwallader. He subsequently joined Bangor City. At the end of the 2006–07 season, he was released by the club, and moved to Stafford Rangers.

After a summer-long trial at Kidderminster Harriers, Adaggio joined Worcester City in August 2008.
 
At the end of the 2008–09 season, Adaggio finished as the club's top scorer with 15 goals and signed a new one-year deal at the club. However, this was on reduced terms due to cost-cutting measures.

On 6 March 2013 he rejoined AFC Telford United until the end of the season. On 11 May 2013 he was released by Telford with five other players.

After being released by Telford, he joined up with Chasetown in pre season. He then agreed a deal for the upcoming season.

Having taken a step down to concentrate on a career in coaching, scoring 40 goals in 38 appearances while playing for Ellesmere Rangers in the West Midlands Regional League, Adaggio signed for Hinckley for the 2014–15 season. Adaggio played two seasons for the newly formed club eventually scoring 48 goals in a total of 60 appearances, before moving back to Chasetown in March 2016.

References

External links 
 
Welsh Premier career stats at welsh-premier.com

1987 births
Living people
Spanish emigrants to the United Kingdom
Association football forwards
Shrewsbury Town F.C. players
AFC Telford United players
Bangor City F.C. players
Stafford Rangers F.C. players
Worcester City F.C. players
Redditch United F.C. players
Nantwich Town F.C. players
Rushall Olympic F.C. players
Newcastle Town F.C. players
Ellesmere Rangers F.C. players
Chasetown F.C. players
Hinckley A.F.C. players
English Football League players
National League (English football) players
Cymru Premier players
English people of Italian descent
English footballers
Association football coaches